German submarine U-1057 was a Type VIIC U-boat of Nazi Germany's Kriegsmarine during World War II.

She was ordered on 5 June 1941, and was laid down on 21 June 1943 at Friedrich Krupp Germaniawerft AG, Kiel, as yard number 691. She was launched on 20 April 1944 and commissioned under the command of Oberleutnant zur See Günther Lüth on 20 May 1944.

Design
German Type VIIC submarines were preceded by the shorter Type VIIB submarines. U-1057 had a displacement of  when at the surface and  while submerged. She had two shafts and two  propellers.

U-1057 was fitted with five  torpedo tubes (four fitted at the bow and one at the stern), fourteen torpedoes or 26 TMA mines, one  SK C/35 naval gun, (220 rounds), one  Flak M42 and two twin  C/30 anti-aircraft guns. The boat had a complement of between 44 — 52 men.

Service history
On 9 May 1945, U-1057 surrendered at Bergen, Norway. She was later transferred to Loch Ryan, Scotland on 2 June 1945.

The Tripartite Naval Commission allocated U-1057 to the Soviet Union. On 4 December 1945, she arrived in Libau, Latvia, as British N-class N22. On 13 February 1946, the Soviet Navy allocated her to the Baltic Fleet. She was renamed S-81 on 9 June 1949 then sent to the reserve fleet on 30 December 1955. S-81 went to the Northern Fleet as a test hulk and was later sunk in the Barents Sea on 24 September 1957, during an atomic bomb test off of Novaya Zemlya. She was struck from the Soviet Navy on 16 October 1957 and broken up for scrap.

References

Bibliography

External links

German Type VIIC submarines
U-boats commissioned in 1944
World War II submarines of Germany
Ships built in Kiel
1943 ships
Maritime incidents in September 1957